Dera (Dra, Dla)  Mangguar and Kamberataro (Komberatoro) is a Senagi language of Papua New Guinea and Indonesia. In Papua New Guinea, it is primarily spoken in Kamberataro village, Amanab Rural LLG, Sandaun Province.

Dialects
There are two dialects, namely Dla proper and Menggwa Dla. Dla proper is spoken in the three main villages of Kamberatoro Mission (3°36′S 141°03′E; 1299 feet) in Papua New Guinea, Amgotro Mission (3°38′S 140°58′E; 1969 feet) in West Papua, and Komando village in West Papua. Komando village was formerly a Dutch border post. Other Dla proper speaking villages in Papua New Guinea are Tamarbek, Akamari, New Kamberatoro; Old Kamberatoro, ‘Border Village’, Nimberatoro, Nindebai, Mamamora, Yamamainda, Orkwanda, and Lihen. West Papua, Indonesia has the Dla villages of Amgotro, Komando, Indangan, Mongwefi, Buku, and Agrinda, which are mostly located in Yaffi District, Keerom Regency.

Menggwa Dla, the less populous of the two dialects, is spoken in five villages located between Kamberatoro Mission and Komando village, which are Menggau, Wahai, Ambofahwa (alternatively known as Wahai Nº 2), Wanggurinda (3°34′59″S, 141°01′41″E) in Papua New Guinea, and Menggwal (3°33′53″S, 140°59′04″E) in West Papua.

Status
Dla (Dera) speakers are shifting to Tok Pisin and Papuan Malay. De Sousa (2006) reports that the younger generation born in the 1990s or later usually cannot speak Dera fluently, whereas the older generation remains fluent.

Phonology
Dera has 14 consonants (4 less than Angor), which are:

Dera has 5 vowels (2 less than Angor), which are:

Vocabulary comparison
The following basic vocabulary words of Dera dialects are from Voorhoeve (1971, 1975), as cited in the Trans-New Guinea database:

{| class="wikitable sortable"
! gloss !! Dera (Amgotro dialect) !! Dera (Moŋgowar dialect) !! Dera (Amgotro dialect)
|-
! head
| boda || bapale || boda
|-
! hair
| nanada || nenale || nanada
|-
! ear
| kumbo- keda || gombo-gala || kumbo- keda
|-
! eye
| kumba- kwada || kamba-gala || kumba- kwada
|-
! nose
| gutubu || damor || gutubu
|-
! tooth
| jabo-gemda || djabo || jabo-gemda
|-
! tongue
| tabu || tep || tabu
|-
! louse
| manə || mave || manə
|-
! dog
| jabodo ||  || jabodo
|-
! pig
| wadə ||  || wadə
|-
! bird
| du || tu || du
|-
! egg
| dogomda || tugabola || dogomda
|-
! blood
| kodoa || hola || kodoa
|-
! bone
| gemda || saba || gemda
|-
! skin
| kueda || kiaba || kueda
|-
! breast
| toto || tutu || toto
|-
! tree
| namo; nomo || agala || namo; nomo
|-
! man
| jani- ndia || jani || jani- ndia
|-
! woman
| kuadedebo || kolbake || kuadedebo
|-
! sun
| kəbu || gəfu || kəbu
|-
! moon
| amana || anam || amana
|-
! water
| kue || gəwei || kue
|-
! fire
| kai || kai || kai
|-
! stone
| nəmai || nimi || nəmai
|-
! road, path
| bakoda ||  || bakoda
|-
! name
|  || dia || 
|-
! eat
| tato- || hede- || tato-
|-
! one
| mano; ŋguadu || mamu || mano; ŋguadu
|-
! two
| imbu || jimbal || imbu
|}

References

Senagi languages
Languages of Sandaun Province
Languages of western New Guinea